The 1987 Australian Football Championships was an Australian rules football series between representative teams of the three major football states. Games involving Victoria were played under State of Origin rules, whilst the match between Western Australia and South Australia involved players based in their respective states at the time. The competition was won by South Australia.

Results

Game 1 

|- style="background:#ccf;"
| Home team
| Home team score
| Away team
| Away team score
| Ground
| Crowd
| Date
| Time
| Broadcast Network
|- style="background:#fff;"
| South Australia
| 12.13 (85)
| Victoria
| 11.15 (81)
| Football Park
| 41,605
| 27 May 1987 
|
|

 E. J. Whitten Medal: Chris Langford (Victoria)
 Fos Williams Medal: Chris McDermott (South Australia)

Game 2 

|- style="background:#ccf;"
| Home team
| Home team score
| Away team
| Away team score
| Ground
| Crowd
| Date
| Time
| Broadcast Network
|- style="background:#fff;"
| South Australia
| 18.16 (124)
| Western Australia
| 9.9 (63)
| WACA
|
| 16 June 1987
|
|

 Fos Williams Medal: Andrew Jarman (South Australia)
 Simpson Medal: Chris McDermott (South Australia)

Game 3 

|- style="background:#ccf;"
| Home team
| Home team score
| Away team
| Away team score
| Ground
| Crowd
| Date
| Time
| Broadcast Network
|- style="background:#fff;"
| Victoria
| 16.20 (116)
| Western Australia
| 13.14 (92)
| Subiaco Oval
| 22,000
| 22 July 1987 
|
|

 Simpson Medal: Andrew Bews (Victoria)
 E. J. Whitten Medal: Greg Williams (Victoria)
 Tassie Medal: Mark Naley (South Australia)

Standings

Squads

References 

Australian rules interstate football
1987 in Australian rules football